The 2008–09 I liga was the 61st season of the second tier domestic division in the Polish football league system since its establishment in 1949 and the 1st season of the Polish I liga under its current title (new name). Formerly, the league was known as the II liga (while the current II liga was known as the III liga). The league was operated by the Polish Football Association (PZPN).

The league was contested by 18 teams who competing for promotion to the 2009–10 Ekstraklasa. The regular season was played in a round-robin tournament. The champions and runners-up will receive automatic promotion. At the other end, the bottom four teams face automatic demotion to the II liga, while the fate of the 13th and 14th-place finishers will be decided by playoffs.

The season began on 26 July 2008, and concluded on 5 June 2009. After the 19th matchday the league will be on winter break between 16 November 2008 and 13 March 2009.

Changes from last season
Promotion and relegation from 2007–08 season.

Ekstraklasa & I liga
Relegated from 2007–08 Ekstraklasa (former I liga) to I liga (former II liga)
 Zagłębie Lubin
 Korona Kielce
 Widzew Łódź

I liga & II liga
Promoted from 2007–08 third tier (former III liga) to I liga (former II liga)
 Górnik Łęczna
 GKP Gorzów Wielkopolski
 Dolcan Ząbki
 Flota Świnoujście

League table

I liga qualification play-offs

Source: 90minut.pl

Season statistics

Top scorers

References

External links
Official website 

2008–09 in Polish football
Pol
I liga seasons